
Gmina Domanice is a rural gmina (administrative district) in Siedlce County, Masovian Voivodeship, in east-central Poland.

Villages
Gmina Domanice contains the villages and settlements of Czachy, Domanice, Domanice-Kolonia, Emilianówka, Kopcie, Olszyc Szlachecki, Olszyc Włościański, Olszyc-Folwark, Pieńki, Podzdrój, Przywory Duże, Przywory Małe, Śmiary-Kolonia and Zażelazna.

Neighbouring gminas
Gmina Domanice is bordered by the gminas of Łuków, Skórzec, Stoczek Łukowski, Wiśniew and Wodynie.

References

Polish official population figures 2006

Domanice
Siedlce County